Jeffrey Omura (born April 23, 1985) is an American actor, politician, and labour organizer.

Early life and education
Omura was born at Sparrow Hospital in Lansing, Michigan on April 23, 1985 and raised in the suburb of Okemos, Michigan. He is the third child of Linda Omura (née Ratliff), founder and owner of Cherry Tree Catering; and Glenn Omura, a professor and Dean at Michigan State University. Glenn is of Japanese descent, born in Hawaii and raised in Los Angeles, California and Falls Church, Virginia. Though Linda was raised in Hazel Park, Michigan, her family has multi-generational roots in Appalachia. The couple met while attending Michigan State University, and were married in 1969 - only two years after interracial marriage was legalized in the United States in Loving v. Virginia.

Omura graduated from Carnegie Mellon University in 2007.

Career

Acting
In 2007, Omura was cast in The Public Theater's Shakespeare in the Park production of Romeo and Juliet, directed by Michael Greif. In 2008 Omura earned his Actors’ Equity Association union card performing in “The Plant That Ate Dirty Socks” an early musical written by Tony Award nominee Joe Iconis. 

Omura made his television debut on the CW’s Gossip Girl episode “Desperately Seeking Serena”, playing Todd Jansen, the ex-boyfriend of Nelly Yuki. The American Broadcasting Company (ABC) featured Omura in its 2009 Walt Disney Television Casting Project Showcase.

Political campaigning
Omura was a volunteer for the John Kerry campaign, registering students in Okemos, Michigan to vote. In 2008, Omura spent a month as a full-time field organizer for the Barack Obama campaign in Lansing, Michigan. In 2018, Omura campaigned for congressional candidate Katie Hill in Santa Clarita, California. Omura was active in two 2020 Democratic campaigns: first, Elizabeth Warren’s Democratic Primary campaign in New Hampshire; and then Joe Biden’s Presidential campaign in Philadelphia, Pennsylvania.

Actors’ Equity
In 2016, the Actors' Equity Association was gearing up to renegotiate its agreement with the Off-Broadway League of Theaters. Omura helped create and lead the Fair Wage OnStage grassroots movement to demand higher wages. With their help, Equity negotiated record-breaking wage increases from 32% to 83%. In 2017, Omura ran for a seat on Equity's National Council and won a three year term. In 2018, he was elected the chair of the International Actors Committee, allowing him to advocate for immigrant artists. Omura was re-elected to Equity's Council in 2020, where he has helped support union members during an industry-wide shut down due to the COVID-19 pandemic. He was influential in resolving a public jurisdictional battle between SAG-AFTRA and Equity. He is one of the organizers behind the #BeAnArtsHero campaign, which organized the national arts sector to collectively lobby Congress for direct arts relief during the 2020 pandemic. The campaign was instrumental in securing $15 billion for the arts.

In 2021, City & State New York named Omura to their Labor 40 Under 40 List in recognition of his work with Actors Equity Association.

City Council
Omura is running to represent New York City Council District 6 in 2021. If elected, he will be the first openly gay person to represent District 6 and the first Japanese-American ever to win elected office in New York State.

Television credits

Theater credits

Off-Broadway

 Romeo & Juliet (Public Theater/NYSF)
 Joe Iconis's The Plant That Ate Dirty Socks (TheatreWorksUSA)
 Charles Francis Chan Jr's Exotic Oriental Murder Mystery (National Asian American Theater Company)
 House Rules (Ma-Yi Theater Company)
 Hamlet (Public Theater Mobile Unit)
 Hello, from the Children of Planet Earth (The Playwrights' Realm)
 Fruiting Bodies (Ma-Yi Theater Company)

Regional

 Take Me Out (barebones productions)
 Macbeth (Hartford Stage)
 La Dispute (Hartford Stage)
 A Midsummer Night's Dream (The Repertory Theater of St. Louis)
 Who's Afraid of Virginia Woolf? (Weston Playhouse)

References 

1985 births
American gay actors
American actor-politicians
American trade union leaders
American activists
Gay politicians

Living people